Blake Little is an entertainment, advertising, and fine art photographer based in Los Angeles since 1982. He has had assignments in advertising, film, television, book and magazine publishing. He has worked with personalities in entertainment, sports and politics.
His work has been exhibited in New York, Seattle, Indianapolis, Los Angeles and Japan.

Early life 
Little was born and raised in Seattle, Washington. After studying for three years at the University of Washington, he transferred to Seattle Central College where he completed his photography degree in 1984. After college, he moved to Los Angeles. His portraits have included David Hockney, John Baldessari and Edward Ruscha, and he has had commercial assignments and work in the entertainment industry.

Photography 
Little has photographed people in entertainment, sports and politics. His clients includes Tom Cruise, Jeff Bridges, Julianne Moore, Steve Carell, Samuel Jackson, Kevin Spacey, Gwyneth Paltrow, Aaron Eckhart, Johnny Knoxville, Marcia Cross, Colin Powell, kd Lang, 50 Cent, Glenn Close, Jane Fonda, Jack Black, Adrien Brody, Jane Lynch, and Brett Favre.
Little works for book and magazine publishers including Simon & Schuster, Random House, Penguin Books, Vanity Fair, Time, People, The Times of London and USA Weekend. He has worked with Henry Cavill and Greg Kinnear. He did covers for I, Rhoda by Valerie Harper, Prime Time by Jane Fonda, and New Rules by Bill Maher. His portrait of Marissa Mayer was featured in Vanity Fair for April 2014 issue.
Little's advertising work includes photography for Austin Powers, Borat and Get Smart.

Monographs 
Little has published three monographs; his first book Dichotomy in 1997, his second publication The Company of Men released in September, 2011, and his third book Manifest in September, 2013.

Exhibitions 

Little had his first museum exhibition; Blake Little: Photographs from the Gay Rodeo at the Eiteljorg Museum in Indianapolis, IN  Jan. 18 – July 13, 2014.

September 2011 - "The Company of Men" Book Signing, Clamp Art Gallery, New York, NY
September 2011 - "The Company of Men" Exhibition and Book Signing, Western Project, Los Angeles, CA
September 2008 - "The Company of Men" Exhibition, Wessel O'Connor Fine Art, Brooklyn, NY
October 1996 - "Dichotomy" Exhibition, G. Ray Hawkins Gallery, Santa Monica, CA
March 1995 - "The Nude and The Contemporary Photograph" Group Exhibition Tokyo Galleria, Tokyo, Japan.
September 1993 - "Photographs, 1990–1994", Wessel O'Connor Fine Art, New York
November 1992 - "The Nude: Classic Beauty" Group Exhibition The Silver Image Gallery, Seattle, WA
July 1992 - "Bare Essentials " Group Exhibition Couturier Gallery, Los Angeles, CA
April 1988 - "Artist's Images of Artists" Group Exhibition Donna Beam Fine Art, Las Vegas, NV
April 1986 - "Light Sensitive VI" Group Exhibition, The Thomas Center Gallery, Gainesville, FL
September 1985 - "Pacific Light " Group Exhibition Jan Kesner Gallery
April 1984 - "New Photographs" Exhibition, James Turcotte Gallery, Los Angeles, CA
November 1983 - "Cities" Group Exhibition, San Francisco Arts Commission, San Francisco, CA
September 1983 - "Los Angeles Ballet" Group Exhibition Bernard Jacobson Gallery, Los Angeles, CA
June 1992 - "Industrial Architecture" Exhibition Cameravision, Los Angeles, CA

Awards 
Little was awarded the American Photo 2014 AP29  and the IPA Lucie Foundation's Int'l Photography Competition in 2013.

References

External links

Photographers from California
Artists from Seattle
Artists from Los Angeles
Year of birth missing (living people)
Living people
University of Washington alumni
Fine art photographers